Kate Plays Christine is a 2016 American documentary film written and directed by Robert Greene. It follows actress Kate Lyn Sheil's preparation for the role of Christine Chubbuck, a newscaster who committed suicide on live television in 1974, for a fictitious film. It is one of the two films about Chubbuck that premiered at the 2016 Sundance Film Festival, the other being Christine.

Release

The film premiered on January 24, 2016, at the 2016 Sundance Film Festival in the U.S. Documentary Competition section, where it won the Special Jury Award for Writing. It was also selected to screen at the 66th Berlin International Film Festival in February 2016. Grasshopper Film acquired the US distribution rights to the film in April 2016. The film was released in one theater on August 26, 2016.

Critical response
On review aggregator website Rotten Tomatoes, the film has an approval rating of 82% based on 55 reviews, with an average rating of 7.3/10. The site's critical consensus reads, "Kate Plays Christine blurs genres—and the line between fact and reality—with a cleverly provocative docudrama look at newscaster Christine Chubbuck's life and death." On Metacritic, the film has a score 75 out of 100, based on 19 critics, indicating "generally favorable reviews".

References

External links
 

2016 documentary films
American documentary films
Films about journalists
Films about suicide
Documentary films about television
Documentary films about journalism
Documentary films about suicide
Films scored by Keegan DeWitt
2010s English-language films
2010s American films